Bornea is a surname. Notable people with the surname include:

Dave Bornea (born 1995), Filipino YouTube personality, actor, model, and dancer
Jade Bornea (born 1995), Filipino boxer